James Campbell (1921 – 1 October 2004) was a Scottish footballer who will be primarily associated with Clyde, whom he joined from junior team Benburb in 1943. He remained at Shawfield for over a decade, with the highlight being the Scottish Cup Final of 1949, but fell out with the club in 1954. He spent a season at Queen of the South and a season at Montrose  before he was appointed Manager of junior club Troon in 1957.

Campbell was capped by Scotland against Belgium on 23 January 1946, the match ending 2–2 at Hampden thanks to a double from Jimmy Delaney.

On leaving the game he worked at Prestwick Airport from 1958 until his retiral in 1980 and lived nearby in Monkton. Jimmy died on 1 October 2004.

References

Sources

External links
London Hearts profile

1921 births
Date of birth missing
2004 deaths
Scottish footballers
Scotland international footballers
Scottish Football League players
Benburb F.C. players
Clyde F.C. players
Troon F.C. players
Queen of the South F.C. players
Montrose F.C. players
People from Govan
Footballers from Glasgow
Scottish football managers
Association football wing halves
Place of death missing
Scottish Junior Football Association managers